Morgan Lewis Martin (March 31, 1805December 10, 1887) was a delegate to the United States House of Representatives from Wisconsin Territory during the 29th United States Congress (1845–1847). He also served as a member of the Wisconsin State Senate and Wisconsin State Assembly, and served as a county judge in Brown County, Wisconsin.

Early life and career
He was born in Martinsburg, New York, and graduated from Hamilton College in 1824. Martin then moved to Detroit, Michigan, in 1826, and studied law, and became an attorney. In May 1827, Martin moved to what is now Green Bay, Wisconsin, on the advice of his cousin, James Duane Doty, to practice law. He formed a partnership with Solomon Juneau and owned much of the land that later became Milwaukee, but sold his share in 1836.

Wisconsin political career

Martin served in the Michigan Territorial Council from 1831 to 1835.  At the time, the land that would become Wisconsin was a part of the Michigan Territory.  He served in the Wisconsin Territorial Legislature from 1838 to 1844, and served as President of the Territorial Council in 1843. He also served as President at the second Wisconsin Constitutional Convention.

Martin was elected on the Democratic Party ticket as a non-voting member to represent the Wisconsin Territory in the Twenty-ninth Congress, with 6,803 votes to 5,787 for Whig James Collins and 790 for Edward D. Holton of the Liberty Party. He would serve from March 4, 1845, to March 3, 1847.

Martin was a candidate for Governor at the 1848 Wisconsin Democratic Party Convention prior to the state's first gubernatorial election. At the time, the party was split between a faction representing the lead-mining regions of the state, supporting Hiram Barber, and a faction of the eastern counties, supporting Martin.  The deadlock between the two factions resulted in a compromise pick—Nelson Dewey.

Martin served in the Wisconsin State Assembly in 1855 and 1872, and served in the Wisconsin State Senate from 1858 to 1859.

Later years

During the Civil War he served as an army paymaster, with the rank of major. In 1875, he became county judge (probate judge) of Brown County, serving until his death. Martin was also involved in the banking and railroad business. He died in Green Bay, Wisconsin, where he had lived and practiced law, and was buried there.

Legacy
Martin has a school named after him in Green Bay, Morgan L. Martin Elementary School. His home, known as Hazelwood, is listed on the National Register of Historic Places. A Westside neighborhood in Milwaukee is also named after him.

Notes

External links

1805 births
1887 deaths
19th-century American judges
19th-century American politicians
Delegates to the United States House of Representatives from Wisconsin Territory
Burials in Wisconsin
Hamilton College (New York) alumni
Lawyers from Detroit
Members of the Michigan Territorial Legislature
Democratic Party members of the Wisconsin State Assembly
Members of the Wisconsin Territorial Legislature
People from Martinsburg, New York
People of New York (state) in the American Civil War
People of Wisconsin in the American Civil War
Politicians from Green Bay, Wisconsin
Wisconsin state court judges
Democratic Party Wisconsin state senators